Room 101 is a radio comedy series that ran from 1992 to 1994 on BBC Radio 5, before transferring to BBC television. Hosted by Nick Hancock, it was an alternative to the more established and formal Desert Island Discs. Celebrities were invited to discuss their "least favourite people, places and pop songs" in order to have them consigned to Room 101.

In January 2023, it was announced that the series will return to radio this time on BBC Radio 4 and hosted by Paul Merton.

Episode guide

Series One (1992)
Paul Merton (9 January)
Jenny Eclair (16 January)
Danny Baker (23 January)
Arthur Smith (30 January)
Steve Punt (6 February)
Annie Nightingale (13 February)

Series Two (1992)
Ian Hislop (14 August)
Jo Brand (21 August)
Tony Slattery (28 August)
John Walters (4 September)
Helen Lederer (11 September)
David Baddiel (18 September)
Stephen Frost (25 September)
Donna McPhail (2 October)

Christmas Special (1992)
Nick Hancock (22 December) – Guest host for this episode was Danny Baker

Series Three (1993)
Frank Skinner (27 August)
Trevor and Simon (3 September)
Caroline Quentin (10 September)
Tony Hawks (17 September)
Rory McGrath (8 October)
Kevin Day (15 October)
Maria McErlane (22 October)
Mark Lamarr (29 October)

Series Four (1994)
Nick Revell (4 March)
Simon Delaney (11 March)
Chris England (18 March)
Andy Hamilton (25 March)

Title
The title refers to the room in George Orwell's 1949 novel Nineteen Eighty-Four which, for each person, represents the worst fear they can imagine. Appropriately, this is supposedly named after a conference room at BBC Broadcasting House where Orwell used to sit through tedious meetings.

See also 
 Room 101 (British TV series)

References

External links
Radio Ha Ha entry for Room 101

Room 101
Radio programs adapted into television shows
1992 radio programme debuts
1994 radio programme endings
Works based on Nineteen Eighty-Four